Nuckols may refer to:

Nuckols (surname), a Norwegian surname
Nuckols, Kentucky, a community in McLean County, Kentucky
Nuckols, Virginia, a community in Buckingham County, Virginia